Frog Level is an unincorporated community located in Caroline County, Virginia.

Frog Level was so named on account of the croaking made by frogs there in the spring.

References

Unincorporated communities in Caroline County, Virginia
Unincorporated communities in Virginia